Deborah C. "Deby" LaPlante (in second marriage Smith; born April 3, 1953) is a retired female track and field athlete from the United States, who competed in the hurdles event. She twice won a medal at the Pan American Games during her career. LaPlante set her personal best in the women's 100m hurdles event on June 16, 1979, clocking 12.86 in Walnut, California.

Deby was voted to the San Diego State Univ Hall of Fame.   Deby LaPlant Sweezey later competed in Masters Track and Field winning the 1995 World Masters Championship (W40) in the hurdles.   1993 Deby held the Masters W40 World Record in the 80 meter hurdles.

References

External links 
 
 Debbie LaPlante (née Lansky, Smith) at trackfield.brinkster.net
 
 World Masters Championship
 Masters W40 80 metres hurdles world record progression

1953 births
Living people
American female hurdlers
Athletes (track and field) at the 1975 Pan American Games
Athletes (track and field) at the 1979 Pan American Games
Pan American Games gold medalists for the United States
Pan American Games silver medalists for the United States
Eastern Michigan Eagles women's track and field athletes
San Diego State Aztecs women's track and field athletes
Pan American Games medalists in athletics (track and field)
Athletes (track and field) at the 1976 Summer Olympics
Olympic track and field athletes of the United States
Medalists at the 1975 Pan American Games
Medalists at the 1979 Pan American Games
American masters athletes
20th-century American women
21st-century American women